Un Hombre cualquiera is a 1954 Argentine film directed by Carlos Rinaldi.

External links
 

1954 films
1950s Spanish-language films
Argentine black-and-white films
Films directed by Carlos Rinaldi
Argentine comedy films
1950s Argentine films